The A53 is a primary route in the English Midlands, that runs from Buxton in Derbyshire to Shrewsbury in Shropshire.

Route of Road
The A53 begins in the centre of Buxton off the A6 road, before meeting the A515 road at a roundabout. Out of the town, it has a junction with the A54 road (to Congleton) before continuing in a south-westerly direction. It crosses the border into the county of Staffordshire, and after leaving the Peak District travels through the town of Leek. It meets the A523 road (to Macclesfield) and the A520 road (to Stone). It crosses the Caldon Canal and travels through the Stoke-on-Trent conurbation, including Hanley and Newcastle-under-Lyme, where it meets a number of major routes such as the A50 road (to Derby), the A500 "D-Road," the Winchester-Salford A34 and the A525 road (to Whitchurch). It crosses the M6 motorway and goes through the village of Ashley. It crosses the border into Shropshire, and bypasses the town of Market Drayton, and passes the Müller factory. It meets the A41 road (to Wolverhampton) at a roundabout, then meets the A442 road (to Telford). The 1.9 km section to the south-west of Shawbury was bypassed in the 1950s - the original A53 road runs adjacent to Shawbury Heath and is now an unclassified country lane. 

The road is single carriageway apart from a  section of dual carriageway between the A500 and Stoke-on-Trent City Centre (Hanley).

Road safety 
The A53 has been reported as a high risk road for several years. According to a report done by the Road Safety Foundation for the European Road Assessment Programme (EuroRAP), the A53 is one of the most dangerous roads in the UK.

In June 2008, a  stretch of the A53 between Leek and Buxton was named as the most dangerous road in the West Midlands. This single carriageway stretch had fourteen fatal and serious injury collisions between 2003 and 2005, and was rated as red—the second highest risk band—in the EuroRAP report publish by the Road Safety Foundation. The challenging character of this section of road makes it attractive to motorcyclists.

References

External links

 SABRE page on the A53
 EuroRAP GB Tracking Survey Results 2008
 Road Safety Foundation

Roads in England
Roads in Derbyshire
Transport in Shropshire
Transport in Staffordshire
Transport in Stoke-on-Trent